Dumbarton Historic District is a national historic district in Pikesville, Baltimore County, Maryland, United States.  The suburban subdivision features curvilinear streets, generously sized lots, and naturalistic landscaping that generally reflect design principles associated with Frederick Law Olmsted.  These features characterized the Roland Park Company's seminal developments. Many of subdivision's original residents were prominent Jewish merchants and industrialists, most of whom were of German descent.

It was added to the National Register of Historic Places in 2009.

See also
History of the Jews in Baltimore
History of the Germans in Baltimore

References

External links

Historic districts on the National Register of Historic Places in Maryland
Historic districts in Baltimore County, Maryland
Historic Jewish communities in the United States
German-Jewish culture in Maryland
German communities in the United States
Jews and Judaism in Pikesville, Maryland
National Register of Historic Places in Baltimore County, Maryland
Pikesville, Maryland
Upper class culture in Maryland